Org is an unincorporated community in Nobles County, Minnesota, United States.

Geography

Org is located approximately four miles southwest of Worthington on Minnesota State Highway 60 and U.S. Route 59.  It lies directly adjacent to the Union Pacific Railroad's Minneapolis-to-Omaha Line.

Main highways include:
 U.S. Highway 59
 Minnesota State Highway 60

History

Origin of name
Org was originally called Islen, after Adrian C. Iselin, one of the directors of the St. Paul and Sioux City Railroad Company. The year was 1872, and no town existed. Iselin consisted of a section house and a water-stop.  Steam locomotives consumed enormous quantities of water, and water-stops were established every 8 to 12 miles along any rail route. Iselin was one of these. When the St. Paul and Sioux City Railroad Company built a spur line from Iselin to Sioux Falls in 1876, the name of the site was changed to Sioux Falls Junction. In 1890 the name was changed to Org by W.A. Scott, a general manager of the Chicago & Northwestern Railway, the company that absorbed the St. Paul and  Sioux City Railroad Company. He considered the railroad junction an ideal location for a town. The significance of the name "Org" remains obscure; it may be derived from "dog".  The town was platted in 1899, and a railroad station was built on the Chicago & Northwestern Railway's main St Paul to Sioux City line. Even though Org never became incorporated, a post  office was established between 1895-1917.

Distinguished visitors
Two American presidents briefly visited Org. Theodore Roosevelt traveled through Org when he was running for president in 1912 as the Bull Moose Party candidate. Woodrow Wilson passed through in 1919 on his nationwide tour to sell the Treaty of Versailles to the nation.  Roosevelt actually stopped in Org and spoke from the back of his train. Wilson's train merely slowed enough to switch from the main Chicago & Northwestern track to the Sioux Falls spur line.

Org's heyday
For many years, the town had but one street—the old wagon road that connected Worthington, Minnesota with Sibley, Iowa. When a paved highway was built in 1931 (U.S. Route 59 / Minnesota State Highway 60), it paralleled the wagon road about 50 yards to the southeast. A one-block long road was constructed connecting the two existing roads, and this third roadway became Org's main business district, at one time boasting several businesses. In its heyday, the town had a post office, a railroad station, a grain elevator, a general store, a lumber company, a coal company, and a filling station.

Org's decline
The Sioux Falls spur line of the Chicago & Northwestern Railway was never widely used, and by the 1950s, the line was all but abandoned. Org's decline soon followed. The grain elevator and railroad station closed. The general store and the filling station followed. By the 1970s, the town consisted of just a few family homes, an abandoned grain elevator, and several dilapidated buildings.

Org today
The last person who claimed to be Mayor of Org, Mark Marcotte, left the town circa 1980, though there is no evidence that Mr. Marcott was actually elected to that post. In 2000, Org's original roadway was downgraded to a "minimum maintenance roadway", and by 2010, many of the remaining homes were bought up by the State of Minnesota to make way for the upgrading of Minnesota State Highway 60 from two lanes to four lanes. The former Chicago & Northwestern Railroad line is now operated by Union Pacific, and is busier than ever. But as for Org, nearly every trace of the town is gone.

Politics
Org is located in Bigelow Township which is located in Minnesota's 1st congressional district, represented by Mankato educator Tim Walz, a Democrat. At the state level, Org is located in Senate District 22, represented by Republican Doug Magnus, and in House District 22B, represented by Republican Rod Hamilton.

Org is in Bigelow Township and is represented by Nobles County Commissioner Matt Widboom.

References

External links
GNIS Map of Org, Minnesota
HomeTownLocator Map of Org, Minnesota
Minnesota Place Names
Rose's History of Nobles County

Unincorporated communities in Nobles County, Minnesota
Unincorporated communities in Minnesota
Populated places established in 1899
1899 establishments in Minnesota
Ghost towns in Minnesota